The 2015–2016 Jordanian Pro League (known as the Al-Manaseer Jordanian Pro League, named after Ziad AL-Manaseer Companies Group for sponsorship reasons) it was the 64th season of the Jordan Premier League, the top Jordanian professional league for football clubs, since its establishment in 1944. The first match was played on 11 September 2015 and finished on 30 April 2016.

Teams

Map 

Source:

Stadia and locations

Prize money

League table

Goals scorers

References

External links
Jordan Premier League at FIFA

Jordanian Pro League seasons
1
Jordan